The Tatanagar–Thawe Express is an express train belonging to South Eastern Railway zone that runs between  and  in India. It is currently being operated with 18181/18182 train numbers on a quad-weekly basis.

Service

The 18181/Tatanagar–Thawe Express has an average speed of 36 km/hr and covers 718 km in 19h 50 m. The 18182/Thawe–Tatanagar Express has an average speed of 36 km/hr and covers 718 km in 20h 10m.

Route and halts 

The important halts of the train are:

 
 
 
 Joychandi Pahar railway station ( alternative)

Coach composition

The train has standard ICF rakes with a max speed of 110 kmph. The train consists of 23 coaches:

 1 AC II Tier
 3 AC III Tier
 9 Sleeper coaches
 7 Second Seating coaches
 2 Seating cum Luggage Rake
 1 Milk Van

Traction

Both trains are hauled by a Tatanagar Loco Shed-based WAP-7 or Asansol Loco Shed-based WAP-4 electric locomotive from Tatanagar to Asansol. From Asansol, trains are hauled by a Asansol Loco Shed-based WAP-4 electric locomotive uptil Thawe and vice versa.

Extension
The train ran between Tatanagar and Samastipur when introduced. It got extended to Muzaffarpur later. This was again extended to Gorakhpur during early 1990s but later got short terminated to Chhapra. The train was again extended to Thawe Junction from 12 April 2021 on the request of Gopalganj MP, Dr. Alok Kumar Suman.

Rake sharing

The train shared its rake with 15083/15084 Utsarg Express before COVID-19 pandemic in India. Currently it shares its rake with Tatanagar-Katihar Express.

Slip coaches

Now Tatanagar-Katihar Express is running independently (now via New Barauni) with Rake Sharing with this train.

Direction reversal

The train reverses its direction 1 times:

See also 

 Tatanagar Junction railway station
 Chhapra Junction railway station
 Utsarg Express

Notes

References

External links 

 18181/Tatanagar–Thawe Express India Rail Info
 18182/Thawe–Tatanagar Express India Rail Info

Transport in Jamshedpur
Transport in Chhapra
Express trains in India
Rail transport in West Bengal
Rail transport in Jharkhand
Rail transport in Uttar Pradesh
Rail transport in Bihar